Rikard Holmdahl is a Swedish physician and immunologist. He was appointed as a full professor and the head of Medical Inflammation Research (MIR) unit at Lund University in 1993. In 2008, Rikard and his whole research group were recruited to Karolinska Institute. His team was the first to discover and positionally clone a single nucleotide polymorphism at the Ncf1 gene causing susceptibility to autoimmune diseases in rat models. Rikard was an adjunct member of the Nobel Committee for physiology or medicine between 2016 and 2021, and was ranked 2nd among the top immunology scientists in Sweden in 2021.

Career 
Rikard Holmdahl obtained his Doctor of Philosophy and Medical Doctor degrees at Uppsala University in 1985 and 1987, respectively. After his clinical residency training during 1988-1989, he started his research fellowship and was promoted as Associate Professor at Swedish Medical Research Council in 1990.

He became a full professor since 1993, and he is now the head of the MIR Division at Karolinska Institute (2008–present). He was a member of the Nobel Assembly during 2014-2021 and an adjunct member of the Nobel committee for physiology or medicine during 2016-2021. He is also a member of the Royal Swedish Academy of Science since 2017.

Awards 
1994: The Göran Gustafsson prize in medicine, Swedish Royal Science Academy.
2002: The European Descartes prize “the most prestigious prize in medicine given by the European Community” 
2003: The SalusAnsvar Nordic Medical prize.
2015: The Anders Jahre main scientific prize, "the most prestigious Nordic prize in medicine".
2015: The Yangtze River Scholar Award, "the highest academic award issued to an individual in higher education by the Ministry of Education of the People's Republic of China".

References 

Living people
1953 births
Uppsala University alumni
21st-century Swedish physicians
20th-century Swedish physicians
Swedish immunologists
Academic staff of Lund University
Academic staff of the Karolinska Institute
Members of the Royal Swedish Academy of Sciences